HMS Inglis (K570) was a  in the Royal Navy.

This, and other Evarts-class destroyer escorts, formed the Captain class of frigates in the Royal Navy and played a vital part in Allied antisubmarine operations in the Atlantic. The Inglis was returned to the U.S. Navy on 20 March 1946. She was sold to C.B. Baldridge, Bay, Ohio, in September 1947 and subsequently scrapped.

References

"Dictionary of American Naval Fighting Ships, Volume III", Navy Department, Office of the Chief of Naval Operations, Naval History Division, Washington, D.C., 1968, Library of Congress card no. 60–60198, page 440.

Evarts-class destroyer escorts
Ships built in Boston
Captain-class frigates
World War II frigates of the United Kingdom
1943 ships